Nancy Romero-Daza is a medical anthropologist with an appointment as associate professor at the University of South Florida. From 1994 to 1998, she worked for the Hispanic Health Council in Hartford, Connecticut in several capacities, including Senior Research Scientist. Her work covers many different areas of medical anthropology, including HIV/AIDS, women's health, health problems in the inner city, infant mortality, drug abuse, syndemics, and commercial sex. Romero-Daza's geographical areas of interest include Costa Rica, Southern Africa, and the United States.

Background

Romero-Daza began her academic career in linguistics, obtaining her Bachelor of Arts degree in Modern Language at the Universidad de los Andes in Bogotá, Colombia in 1984 and her Master of Arts in Linguistics at the State University of New York at Buffalo in Amherst, New York in 1998. She then stayed at the State University of New York at Buffalo to obtain her Master of Arts (1990) and her PhD in anthropology (1994).

Between 1994 and 1998, she worked at the Hispanic Health Council as ethnographer Student Intern Coordinator, Women and Chemical Dependency Unit Coordinator, AIDS Education and Prevention Unit Coordinator, and Senior Research Scientist. While there she worked with medical anthropologist Merrill Singer.

In 1998, Romero-Daza accepted an appointment at the University of South Florida as an assistant professor in the anthropology department. In 2005 she was named associate professor and continues to work in that capacity. From 2009 to 2012 she served as the graduate director in the anthropology department. From 2000 to 2013 she was the co-director of the Globalization and Community Health Field School in Monteverde, Costa Rica. This field school is an educational and research institute that provides graduate and undergraduate students the chance to learn qualitative and quantitative methods to conduct community-based health research. Romero-Daza was project director for six seasons in Monteverde and is currently working on an NSF-funded research project on the impact of tourism on food security in the surrounding geographical area.

Scholarship

During her time at the Hispanic Health Council, Romero-Daza studied AIDS, violence, and health issues. She continued her work at the University of South Florida, focusing on substance abuse. Through her research on HIV/AIDS in North America and Africa, Romero-Daza focused on the need for HIV/AIDS research that looks at the social, political, and economic contexts of HIV/AIDS epidemics, concentrating specifically on both the local and global contexts.

Publications

Romero-Daza's publications address several areas of anthropological inquiry, including but not limited to HIV/AIDS in developing countries, HIV/AIDS among minority populations, traditional healing practices, maternal and child health, reproductive health, health care decision making, cultural competency in service provision, political economy of health, HIV risk among sex workers and injection drug users, and medical pluralism. Selected works are listed below:

 Romero-Daza, N., Baldwin, J., Lescano, C., Williamson, H.J., Tilley, D.L., I. Chan, M. Tewell, 	Palacios, W.R. Syndemic Theory as a Model for Training and Mentorship to Address HIV/AIDS Among Latinos in the U.S. Annals of Anthropological Practice 35(1) 
 Romero-Daza, N., Ruth, A.; Denis-Luque, M; Luque, J. (2009) Caring for Haitian  Orphans with AIDS, an Alternative Model of Care for HIV Positive Children. Journal of Healthcare for the Poor and Underserved. (20)4 (supplement): 36-40
 Romero-Daza, N., Freidus, A. (2008) Female Tourists, Casual Sex, and HIV/AIDS in Costa 	Rica. Qualitative Sociology (31)2: 169-187
 Romero-Daza, N (2005) Design of HIV awareness materials in rural Costa Rica: A community participatory approach. AIDS and Anthropology Bulletin (17)2: 23-25.
 Romero-Daza, N., Weeks, M., Singer, M. (2005) Conceptualizing the impact of indirect 	violence on HIV risk among women involved in street level prostitution. Aggression and 	Violent Behavior, 10(2): 153-170. 
 Romero-Daza, N., Himmelgreen, D. (2004) The Sotho: Health and Illness: Encyclopedia of Medical Anthropology: Health and Illness in the World Cultures, Kluwer Academic Publishers, 	New York: Vol 2: 957-964 
 Romero-Daza, N., Weeks, M., Singer, M. (2003) “Nobody gives a damn if I live or die”. Experiences of violence among drug-using sex workers in Hartford, CT. Medical Anthropology 22(3): 233-259.

Recognition
 
 University of South Florida, Office of the Provost, Outstanding Graduate Student Mentor Award (2005)
 University of South Florida, Hispanic Heritage Faculty Award (2007)
 Selected by the CDC as a reviewer for the HIV/AIDS Special Emphasis Panel (February 2004 and September 2004)
 Recognition for her contribution to the Community Based Education Program at the University of Connecticut School of Medicine (1996–1997)

References

 
 
 
 
 

Living people
Medical anthropologists
Year of birth missing (living people)